R. H. Williams may refer to:

Political figures
Richard H. Williams (New York) (1807–after 1863), American state senator
Richard Henry Williams (1852–1924), Canadian merchant; mayor of Regina, Saskatchewan

Writers and academics
Richard Hughes Williams (1878–1919), Welsh-language writer
Robert H. Williams (physicist) (born 1940), American scientist
Robin Williams (physicist) (Robert Hughes Williams; born 1941), Welsh physicist and academic
Rhys H. Williams (sociologist) (born 1955), American professor of sociology
Rosalind H. Williams, American historian of technology

Others
R. H. Williams (rugby player) (1930–1993), Welsh rugby union player
Robert Hardin Williams (1909–1979), American physician, president of Endocrine Society.

See also
Williams (surname)